The Halifax Regional Municipality has a number of parks and recreation areas in urban and rural settings.

Urban and suburban parks 
 Admiral's Cove Park 
 Admiral Harry DeWolf Park  
 Africville Park (formerly Seaview Park) 
 Albro Lake Park 
 Arnold Witwork Park 
 Ashley Cheeseman Memorial Park
 Beazley Park 
 Bedford Lions Sandy Lake Park 
 Bell Lake Park 
 Birch Cove 
 Bissett Lake Park 
 Brownlow Park (in Manor Park) 
 Charlie Park 
 Chocolate Lake  
 City Waterfront Park, Dartmouth 
 Halifax Common (The Common) 
 Conrose Field (The Horsefields) 
 Cornwallis Park 
 Cyril Smith Golden Acres Park 
 Crawthorne Park 
 Dartmouth Common 
 Deadman's Island Park 
 Eastern Passage Commons 
 Findley Community Park 
 Flinn Park 
 Forest Hills Commons 
 Farrell Park 
 Grahams Cove 
Gorsebrook Park 
 Graves-Oakley Memorial Park 
 Hemlock Ravine 
 Horseshoe Island Park 
 J. Albert Walker Sports Field 
 Jason MacCullough Park
 Larry O'Connell Field 
 Mainland Common 
 Mary Clayton Memorial Park
 Maybank Park 
 Merv Sullivan Park 
 Millers Mountain Park 
 Northbrook Park 
 Old Hill Lake Park 
 Oleary Drive Park 
 Owls Nest Island - Little Micmac Park 
Penhorn Lake Beach Park  
  Perrin Road Park 
 Pinehill Lookoff Park 
 Point Pleasant Park 
 Public Gardens 
 Russell Lake Park 
 Saunders Park (Chebucto Park)
 Schwarzwald Park 
Shubie Park 
 Sir Sandford Fleming Park (The Dingle)
 Sullivan's Pond 
 Tremont Park 
 Urban Wilderness Park 
 Victoria Park 
 Yetter Park

Wilderness areas

 Blue Mountain-Birch Cove Lakes Wilderness Area
Boggy Lake Wilderness Area  
Clattenburgh Brook Wilderness Area 
Peggys Cove Preservation Area
Ship Harbour Long Lake Wilderness Area 
Tangier Grand Lake Wilderness Area  
Terence Bay Wilderness Area 
Waverley-Salmon River Long Lake Wilderness Area  
White Lake Wilderness Area

Game sanctuaries
Liscomb Game Sanctuary 
Waverley Game Sanctuary

National parks
Sable Island National Park Reserve

Provincial parks
Clam Harbour Beach Provincial Park  
Cleveland Beach Provincial Park  
Cole Harbour -Lawrencetown Coastal Heritage Park System
Salt Marsh Trail 
Lawrencetown Beach Provincial Park  
Rainbow Haven Beach Provincial Park 
Crystal Crescent Beach Provincial Park 
Dollar Lake Provincial Park 
Elderbank Provincial Park 
Gibraltar Rock Provincial Park Reserve
Herring Cove Provincial Park Reserve
Laurie Provincial Park  
Lewis Lake Provincial Park 
Long Lake Provincial Park 
Martinique Beach Provincial Park 
McCormack Beach Provincial Park 
McNabs Island Provincial Park  
Moose River Gold Mines Provincial Park 
Musquodoboit Valley Provincial Park  
Oakfield Provincial Park  
Porters Lake Provincial Park  
Powder Mill Lake Provincial Park 
Queensland Beach Provincial Park 
Taylors Head Provincial Park 
William E. Degarthe Provincial Park

Rural
Kidstone Lake/ Rockingstone Park 
Moser River Seaside Park 
Oceanic Drive Park  
Second Lake 
West River Sheet Harbour Picnic Park

National historic sites
 Halifax Citadel National Historic Site (The Citadel)
Fort Charlotte National Historic Site 
 Fort McNab National Historic Site 
York Redoubt National Historic Site 
Prince of Wales Tower National Historic Site of Canada

Trails
Atlantic View Trail 
Beechville Lakeside Timberlea Rails to Trails 
Bissett Road Trail 
Blueberry Run Trail 
Chain of Lakes Trail
Dartmouth Harbourfront Walkway 
DeWolfe Park Boardwalk 
Fort Sackville Walkway
Frog Pond Trail 
Little Sackville River Greenway 
Lake Charles, Nova Scotia Trail 
Mainland North Linear Parkway 
McCurdy Woodlot Trails 
Moser River Interpretive Trail 
 Musquodoboit Trail System 
Nova Scotia Coastal Water Trail 
Old Annapolis Road Hiking Trail 
 Pennant Point Trail 
Polly's Cove Trail 
Portland Lakes Trail 
Salmon River Trail 
Salt Marsh Trail 
 Spider Lake Trail

External links
 Halifax Parks and Recreation
 Nova Scotia Provincial Parks - Halifax region

 
Halifax
Parks
Halifax